Family with sequence similarity 104 member B is a protein that in humans is encoded by the FAM104B gene.

References

Further reading